Out Of The Darkness is Sacred Mother Tongue's second album and their second release in association with EMI Label Services (the first being the EP, A Light Shines, in 2012). The album was released on April 15, 2013.

Track listing

Personnel
Sacred Mother Tongue
 Darrin South – vocals
 Andy James – lead guitar
 Josh Gurner – bass guitar
 Lee Newell – drums

References

2013 albums
Sacred Mother Tongue albums